Erdrich is a surname. Notable people with the surname include:

Heid E. Erdrich (born 1963), Native American poet
Louise Erdrich (born 1954), American author

See also
Edrich